The Central Air Force Museum is an aviation museum in Monino, Moscow Oblast, Russia. A branch of the Central Armed Forces Museum, it is one of the world's largest aviation museums, and the largest for Soviet aircraft, with a collection including 173 aircraft and 127 aircraft engines on display. The museum also features additional displays, including Cold War-era American espionage equipment, weapons, instruments, uniforms, artwork, and a library containing books, films, and photos is also accessible to visitors.

History 
The origins of the museum go back to 1940 when the village of Monino was selected to be the location of what is now the Gagarin Air Force Academy. The museum itself was founded in 1958, two years after the airfield was closed, and had 6 aircraft and 20 aircraft guns at the time. When it opened to the public another two years later in 1960, it had 14 aircraft. By early 1970, the museum's collection had expanded to about 40 aircraft. In 1990, the aircraft on display were rearranged according to design bureau and chronological order. The museum's main hall with the awards, documents, uniforms and personal belongings of the famous pilots was mostly destroyed by fire in 2005. By 2013, a new hangar had been built to house the World War II aircraft. In 2016, it was reported that the museum was to close, with the exhibits being transferred to Patriot Park. When transporting large-sized unique aircraft, the exhibits were threatened with the breakage. At the request of the Ministry of Culture, the movement was stopped. New halls with the modern equipment for exhibitions were built. However, a new exhibition hall was opened in February 2020.

Prior to 1999, the museum was closed to the public, because of the display of classified prototypes from the era of the former Soviet Union.. Today, the museum contains a range of aircraft, both domestic and foreign, including military, civil and special purpose. The museum also houses associated pieces, such as the uniforms, documents, models and equipment related to the aircraft. The museum is currently open to members of the public to visit.

Visiting 
Since the museum is situated on the territory of a military unit (Gagarin Air Force Academy), all visitors must pass the entrance gate to the military complex.

Facilities 
There are two large hangars with well-displayed items and much material about the items, but all in Russian, although some have a brief translation into English.

Aircraft on display 

Transport and passenger aircraft

Fighters and Attack aircraft

Bombers

Helicopters

Other aircraft

See also
List of aerospace museums
Ryazan Museum of Long-Range Aviation

References
Citations

Bibliography
 На авиамузей в Монино наплевали с большой высоты
 Центральный музей ВВС в Монино

External links

 Homepage of the Monino museum
Guide for foreign visitors and virtual tour
Information and photos of the museum 
 Central Armed Forces Museum page for the museum

Air force museums
Russian military aviation
Russian Air Force
Soviet Air Force
Aerospace museums in Russia
Military and war museums in Russia
Cold War museums
Museums in Moscow Oblast
Open-air museums in Russia